Lincoln School is a historic elementary school building located at Hornell, Steuben County, New York. It was built in 1923–1924, and is a three-story, Neoclassical revival style dark brick building.  It has a flat roof and brick and terra cotta trim.  Attached to the main block is a two-story addition containing a combined gymnasium and auditorium.  It served as a neighborhood elementary school until 1979 and as an office building until 2012.

It was listed on the National Register of Historic Places in 2015.

References

School buildings on the National Register of Historic Places in New York (state)
Neoclassical architecture in New York (state)
School buildings completed in 1924
Schools in Steuben County, New York
National Register of Historic Places in Steuben County, New York
Hornell, New York
1924 establishments in New York (state)